Chennai Superstarz (formerly known as Chennai Smashers) is a franchise badminton team based in Chennai that plays in the Premier Badminton League (PBL). The team has won the PBL title once, has been in the semi-finals of the league twice in their five appearances. They won the 2017 season beating Mumbai Rockets 3–2. The franchise was renamed from Chennai Smashers to Chennai Superstarz in 2020.

History 
The team's first season in the PBL was in 2016. Vijay Prabhakaran initially owned the franchise from 2016 to 2019. In December 2019, Sivakumar who owns a regional badminton league named Tamil Nadu Badminton Super League acquired the franchise to become its new owner. The franchise also changed its name into Chennai Superstarz for the 2020 season.

Rio Olympics silver medallist P. V. Sindhu was part of the team for the first three seasons. They won their first and only PBL title in 2017. With P. V. Sindhu in their roster, they defeated Mumbai Rockets 3–2 in the final at New Delhi. During the third and fourth seasons, the team finished sixth. They failed to get past Northeastern Warriors in the semi-finals (-1)–3. The team is currently coached by Aravindan Samiappan.

Home venue 
From 2017, the Jawaharlal Nehru Indoor stadium serves as the home for the team. The stadium located in Chennai, has a seating capacity of 5,000. In 2016, there was no home venue for the team due to unavailability of Jawaharlal Nehru Indoor stadium in Chennai and Coimbatore.

Current squad

Seasons

Result summary

 Last updated: 7 February 2020; Source: Official PBL website

Season 3

Results

Points table
Each tie (MP) will have five matches each. Regular Match Win (RMW) = 1 point, Trump Match Win (TMW) = 2 points, Trump Match Lost (TML) = -1 point.

Player statistics

Season 4

Results

Points table
Each tie (MP) will have five matches each. Regular Match Win (RMW) = 1 point, Trump Match Win (TMW) = 2 points, Trump Match Lost (TML) = -1 point.

Season 5

Points table

Results

Semifinal

Player statistics 

Last updated: 5 February 2020; Source: Official PBL website

Chennai Superstarz finished third in the league stage with 22 points qualifying for the semifinals. They won all of their trump matches becoming the only team in the season to do so. They lost to Northeastern Warriors in the semifinal. This was their second PBL semifinal loss in five appearances.

Former squads 

 Team captains listed in bold.

References

External links 
 

Premier Badminton League teams
Sport in Chennai
Sports teams in Tamil Nadu